La Cienega/Jefferson station is an elevated light rail station on the E Line of the Los Angeles Metro Rail system. The station is located over the intersection of La Cienega Boulevard and Jefferson Boulevard, after which the station is named, in the Baldwin Hills/Crenshaw and West Adams neighborhoods of Los Angeles. The station briefly served as the western terminus of the E Line between the opening of the line on April 28, 2012 and the completion of the Culver City station on June 20, 2012.

History 

Originally a stop on the Los Angeles and Independence and Pacific Electric railroads, it closed on September 30, 1953, with the closure of the Santa Monica Air Line and remained out of service until re-opening on Saturday, April 28, 2012. It was completely rebuilt for the opening of the Expo Line from little more than a station stop marker. Regular scheduled service resumed Monday, April 30, 2012.

Development of surrounding area 
Los Angeles architect Eric Owen Moss proposed a 17-story glass ribbon office tower with underground parking with within steps of this station. The tower began preparation in late 2018.

Condominiums and retail across from the station is currently under construction. It will be built by the Carmel Partners firm.

Service

Station layout 

A large parking structure located just south of the station provides "park-and-ride" access to the station.

Hours and frequency

Connections 
, the following connections are available:
 Culver CityBus: 4
 the Link: Baldwin Hills Parklands Shuttle

Station artwork 
The station's public art was created by Daniel Gonzales and titled Engraved in Memory consisting of pole-mounted glazed ceramic bas relief panels depicting the history of the Ballona Creek and Culver City areas.

References 

E Line (Los Angeles Metro) stations
Railway stations in Los Angeles
Baldwin Hills, Los Angeles
Railway stations in the United States opened in 2012
2012 establishments in California
Pacific Electric stations